Fern H. Shubert is a former Republican member of the North Carolina General Assembly representing the state's thirty-fifth Senate district, including constituents in Mecklenburg and Union counties.  An accountant from Marshville, North Carolina, Shubert served in the State House from 1994 to 1998 and again from 2000 to 2002. She served in the State Senate from 2002 to 2004, where she was the Republican whip.

Before it folded, she wrote a column in the County Edge, a weekly publication in Union County, and still weighs in on local political issues including a fight against a half-cent prepared food and beverage tax that would have helped build a civic center in Monroe.

Shubert was one of the candidates for the Republican gubernatorial nomination to challenge Governor Mike Easley in the 2004 election. The sole woman in a field of six contenders for the GOP nomination, Shubert campaigned as an outsider to the party establishment, but placed fifth in the primary, gathering only 4% of votes cast.

Shubert ran to return to her old Senate seat in 2010. She lost the Republican primary on May 4 to Tommy Tucker. In 2012, Shubert filed to run for North Carolina State Auditor.

On March 11, 2019, Shubert filed to run in the Republican primary to select a candidate for the 9th Congressional district 2019 special election, ordered by the North Carolina State Board of Elections after the Board declined to certify the race's November 6, 2018 outcome due to allegations of election fraud.

References

External links

|-

|-

Republican Party North Carolina state senators
Republican Party members of the North Carolina House of Representatives
Women state legislators in North Carolina
People from Marshville, North Carolina
Living people
21st-century American politicians
21st-century American women politicians
1947 births
20th-century American politicians
20th-century American women politicians